Radhakishorepur railway station is a railway station on Cuttack–Sambalpur line under the Khurda Road railway division of the East Coast Railway zone. The railway station is situated beside Gurudijhatia Road at Radhadamodarpur in Cuttack district of the Indian state of Odisha.

References

Railway stations in Cuttack district
Khurda Road railway division